The list of Jurchen inscriptions comprises a list of the corpus of known inscriptions written in the Jurchen language using the Jurchen script.  There are ten monumental inscriptions, mostly dating to the Jin dynasty (1115–1234), but the latest monument dates to the early Ming Dynasty (1413).  There are also a number of short Jurchen inscriptions on portable artefacts such as mirrors, seals and paiza. In contrast with inscriptions in Khitan scripts, there are no known examples of stone-inscribed epitaphs in the Jurchen script.

Monumental inscriptions in the Jurchen script

Other inscriptions in the Jurchen script

See also

 List of Khitan inscriptions

Notes

Footnotes

References

External links

Jurchen inscriptions
Jurchen inscriptions